Joseph F. Malmisur (March 13, 1929 – October 14, 2018) was an American football coach and college athletics administrator. He served as the head football coach at Heidelberg College—now known as Heidelberg University—in Tiffin, Ohio from 1962 to 1968 and Hiram College in Hiram, Ohio from 1969 to 1982, compiling a career college football coaching record of 68–107–8. Malmisur ended his career as the athletic director at Youngstown State University from 1983 to 1994.

A native of Youngstown, Ohio, Malmisur played college football at Heidelberg, starting at quarterback from 1948 to 1950. After graduating in 1951, he remained at Heidelberg for two years as an assistant football coach under head coach Paul Hoernemann. Malmisur was the head football coach at Wellston High School in Wellston, Ohio from 1955 to 1957 and Lima High School in Lima, Ohio from 1958 to 1961.

Head coaching record

College football

References

1929 births
2018 deaths
American football quarterbacks
Heidelberg Student Princes football coaches
Heidelberg Student Princes football players
Hiram Terriers football coaches
Youngstown State Penguins athletic directors
High school football coaches in Ohio
Players of American football from Youngstown, Ohio